Lip Sync Battle is an American musical reality competition television series that premiered on April 2, 2015, on the American cable network Spike, later known as Paramount Network. The show is based on an idea by Stephen Merchant and John Krasinski, in which celebrities battle each other with lip sync performances. The idea was introduced as a recurring segment on Late Night with Jimmy Fallon and later The Tonight Show Starring Jimmy Fallon, before being developed into a separate show.

The premiere episode was the highest-rated premiere in Spike's history. Lip Sync Battle has been a hit show for the network.  The series' success has led to the creation of various international adaptations. In August 2018, the show was renewed for a fifth season which premiered on January 17, 2019.

On September 22, 2020, it was announced that the series would move to another ViacomCBS network as part of the Paramount Network's now-scrapped planned shift to films. However, no new home for the program has been announced since then.

Overview 
Lip Sync Battle debuted on Spike on April 2, 2015. It is produced by John Krasinski and Stephen Merchant and hosted by rapper and actor LL Cool J. Model Chrissy Teigen serves as color commentator.

The show is a spin-off of a segment first introduced on Late Night with Jimmy Fallon. Merchant, Krasinski and Emily Blunt, were brainstorming ideas for Krasinski's upcoming appearance on Late Night when the idea took shape. Jimmy Fallon then developed it into a recurring segment on his show. The game pits two celebrities against each other in a lip syncing battle for two rounds. The audience votes for the winner, who receives a Lip Sync Battle belt reminiscent of the WCW Television Championship title belt.

In 2014, Merchant, Krasinski and Fallon pitched the show to NBC, who passed on it. NBC's cable channels USA Network and Bravo also passed. The competition series was eventually picked up by Spike, which was then rebranding. "Part of what I wanted to do with Lip Sync Battle is increase co-viewing, but also add diversity to the network," said network president Kevin Kay.

Lip Sync Battle has been a major success for Spike. Its series premiere drew 2.2 million viewers, the channel's highest-rated non-scripted premiere. Kay described the show as "a television and viral rock star for Spike." The show was renewed for a second season of 20 episodes on April 22, 2015.

In January 2016, the network renewed the series for a third season consisting of another 20 episodes. "Lip Sync Battle is a multiplatform pop-culture phenomenon that has played an integral role in delivering a new and broader audience to Spike," Kay said.

In July 2016, the show received a Primetime Emmy Award nomination in the Outstanding Structured Reality Program category. 

In 2017, it was announced that the show would air a live hour-long special (Lip Sync Battle Live: A Michael Jackson Celebration) on January 18, 2018, to coincide with the relaunch of Spike as the  Paramount Network. Neil Patrick Harris, Taraji P. Henson and Hailee Steinfeld were announced as the first set of performers for the Michael Jackson-themed special, which originated from the Dolby Theatre and included a presentation from Cirque du Soleil's Las Vegas residency Michael Jackson: One. 

On August 22, 2018, the show was renewed for a fifth season consisting of 12 episodes that premiered on January 17, 2019.

Episodes

Reception

Critical response 
Josef Adalian in Vulture said that Lip Sync Battle is "looking like a legitimate hit, both on TV and online." He also added that the show's creators "opted not to impose artificial demographic targets. They also went out of their way not to futz up the very simple premise that worked so well on Fallon’s late-night shows." Amy Amatangelo of The Hollywood Reporter said that the debut of the show "had moments of great fun," although she added that the series "still seems like it is better suited as an interlude on The Tonight Show," and that "some things are better in small doses." Adelle Platon of Vibe wrote that the show "is a welcome break from other singing shows crowding primetime," also adding that "with the in-house crowd serving as judges, the spirit of competition between both parties makes it a fun-for-all". Emily Yahr from The Washington Post was more negative towards the show by saying that "taking out all the spontaneity and replacing it with the cheesy-slick production values of an American Idol group medley, Lip Sync Battle will probably wear out its welcome soon."

Ratings 
The series premiere of Lip Sync Battle delivered 2.2 million total viewers via Nielsen ratings, including a 1.3 rating in the 18–49 demographic, which is the most important to advertisers. The episode notched the largest viewership for an unscripted series debut in the network's history and the largest average audience in the slot in more than eight years. The total audience for the first several episodes of the show, including DVR replays and multiple reruns, has climbed past 15 million television viewers. Spike has also stated that various performance clips from the first three half-hour episodes of the show had already generated nearly 100 million online streams, as of April 2015.

In Australia, the series premiere scored 1.124 million viewers in preliminary overnight viewership, making it the fourth most-watched program on free-to-air television for the evening. The second episode the following week scored 1.087 million preliminary overnight viewers and was ranked the fifth-highest-rated program on free-to-air television of the night. This success has led to suggestions by commentators that a local adaption could be imminent.

International versions

Spin-off

A one-hour special, hosted by Sarah Hyland, aired on Nickelodeon on December 11, 2016 (followed by a repeat airing on Spike on December 14). In March 2017, a series order was announced for the kid-centered spinoff. In August 2017, it was announced that Nick Cannon would be replacing Sarah Hyland as the host and that JoJo Siwa would be joining him as his sidekick on Lip Sync Battle Shorties, which premiered in early 2018.

See also

Great Pretenders
Lip Service

Notes

References

External links

2015 American television series debuts
2019 American television series endings
2010s American reality television series
2010s American music television series
English-language television shows
Musical game shows
Spike (TV network) original programming
Paramount Network original programming
Television series by Matador Content
Television series created by Stephen Merchant
Television shows directed by Beth McCarthy-Miller